Dominique-Ceslas Gonthier (22 September 1853 – 16 June 1917) was a Canadian Roman Catholic priest, Dominican, author, and professor.

References

1853 births
1917 deaths
19th-century Canadian Roman Catholic priests
Canadian Dominicans
People from Chaudière-Appalaches